James, Jim or Jimmy Dunn may refer to:

Politicians
James Dunn (Australian politician) (1887–1945), Australian Senator
James Dunn (Victorian politician) (1886–1975), member of the Victorian Parliament
James Clement Dunn (1890–1979), U.S. ambassador
James Dunn (British politician) (1926–1985), MP for Liverpool, Kirkdale
James B. Dunn (1927–2016), American politician
Jim Dunn (Washington politician) (born 1942), elected to the Washington State House, 2006
James Whitney Dunn (born 1943), U.S. Representative from the state of Michigan

Sportspeople
Jim Dunn (baseball owner) (1865–1922), owner of the Cleveland Indians baseball team
Jimmy Dunn (soccer) (1897–1987), American soccer player
Jimmy Dunn (sports executive) (1898–1979), Canadian multi-sport executive and Hockey Hall of Fame inductee
Jimmy Dunn (footballer, born 1900) (1900–1963), Scottish international footballer (Hibernian, Everton)
James W. Dunn (1911–1983), American football coach
Jimmy Dunn (footballer, born 1922) (1922–2005), Scottish footballer (Leeds United)
Jimmy Dunn (footballer, born 1923) (1923–2014), Scottish footballer (Wolves, Derby County)
Jim Dunn (pitcher) (1931–1999), American baseball pitcher
James Dunn (rugby league) (born 1933), English rugby league footballer
James Dunn (soccer) (born 1971), American soccer defender
James Dunn (sledge hockey) (born 2000), Canadian sledge hockey player

Others
J. C. Dunn or James Churchill Dunn (1871–1955), British army medical officer and author
James Francis Dunn (1874–1921), American architect
Sir James Hamet Dunn (1874–1956), 1st Baronet, Canadian financier and industrialist
James Philip Dunn (1884–1936), American composer and organist
James Dunn (actor) (1901–1967), actor who performed in Bad Girl and A Tree Grows In Brooklyn
James Dunn (diplomat) (1928–2020), Australian diplomat
James Dunn (theologian) (1939–2020), British Protestant New Testament scholar
James Nicol Dunn (1856–1919), Scottish journalist and newspaper editor
Jimmy Dunn (comedian), American stand-up comedian and actor
Jim Dunn (writer), television writer and producer
James Dunn, member of the R&B group The Stylistics

See also
Jamie Dunn (born 1950), Australian comedian
James Dunne (disambiguation)